The 2018–19 North Dakota Fighting Hawks women's basketball team represents the University of North Dakota during the 2018–19 NCAA Division I women's basketball season. The Fighting Hawks were led by seventh year head coach Travis Brewster and play their home games at the Betty Engelstad Sioux Center. They were first year members of the Summit League. They finished the season 12–19, 6–10 in Summit League play to finish in sixth place. They advanced to the semifinals of the Summit League women's tournament where they lost to South Dakota.

Roster

Schedule

|-
!colspan=9 style=| Exhibition

|-
!colspan=9 style=| Non-conference regular season

|-
!colspan=9 style=| Summit League regular season

|-
!colspan=9 style=| Summit League Women's Tournament

See also
2018–19 North Dakota Fighting Hawks men's basketball team

References

North Dakota Fighting Hawks women's basketball seasons
North Dakota
Fight
Fight